Sukanta Kumar Paul is an Indian politician. He is a youth leader. He is a member of All India Trinamool Congress. He was elected as MLA of West Bengal Legislative Assembly in 2021 assembly election from Amta Constituency.

References 

Trinamool Congress politicians from West Bengal
Living people
People from Howrah district
West Bengal MLAs 2021–2026
Year of birth missing (living people)